Ercolania tentaculata  is a species of sacoglossan sea slug, a shell-less marine opisthobranch gastropod mollusk in the family Limapontiidae.

References

Limapontiidae
Gastropods described in 1917